Alfred Thomas Messer (8 March 1900 – 1947) was a footballer who played for Sutton Town, Mansfield Town, Reading, Nottingham Forest, Tottenham Hotspur and Bournemouth.

Football career 
Messer played non League football at Sutton Town before joining Mansfield Town. In 1922 he joined Nottingham Forest but left the club without playing a senior match. The centre half signed for Reading in 1923 and went on to feature in 271 matches and scored 18 goals between 1923–29. Messer signed for Tottenham Hotspur in 1930 and played in 52 games and found the net twice in all competitions. On leaving White Hart Lane he joined Bournemouth & Boscombe where he made a further 10 appearances and where he finally ending his playing career.

References 

1900 births
1947 deaths
Footballers from Deptford
English footballers
English Football League players
Mansfield Town F.C. players
Nottingham Forest F.C. players
Reading F.C. players
Tottenham Hotspur F.C. players
AFC Bournemouth players
Ashfield United F.C. players
Association football central defenders